At 7:30 am on 25 November 2021, in Mogadishu, Somalia, a suicide bomber in a sport utility vehicle killed eight people and wounded 17 others, including teachers and pupils at Mocaasir Primary and Secondary School, which was heavily damaged. Al-Shabaab military operations spokesman Abdiasis Abu Musab claimed his jihadist group was responsible, and had targeted an African Union Mission to Somalia convoy.

References

2021 murders in Somalia
2020s building bombings
November 2021 bombing
21st-century mass murder in Somalia
November 2021 bombing
November 2021 bombing
Building bombings in Somalia
Mass murder in 2021
November 2021 bombing
November 2021 crimes in Africa
November 2021 events in Africa
School bombings
School killings in Africa
Suicide bombings in 2021
November 2021
Suicide car and truck bombings in Somalia
Terrorist incidents in Somalia in 2021